The 2021 Austrian Grand Prix (officially known as the Bitci Motorrad Grand Prix von Österreich) was the eleventh round of the 2021 Grand Prix motorcycle racing season and the fifth round of the 2021 MotoE World Cup. It was held at the Red Bull Ring in Spielberg on 15 August 2021.

Background
Yamaha suspended and withdrew Maverick Viñales from the entry list of the Grand Prix prior to the weekend for an “unexplained irregular operation of the motorcycle” after Round 10 in Styria.

Qualifying

MotoGP

Race

MotoGP

Moto2

 Lorenzo Baldassarri was declared unfit to compete due to effects of a hand injury suffered at the German GP.

Moto3

 Ryusei Yamanaka suffered a broken humerus in a collision with Gabriel Rodrigo during practice and withdrew from the event.

MotoE

All bikes manufactured by Energica.

Championship standings after the race
Below are the standings for the top five riders, constructors, and teams after the round.

MotoGP

Riders' Championship standings

Constructors' Championship standings

Teams' Championship standings

Moto2

Riders' Championship standings

Constructors' Championship standings

Teams' Championship standings

Moto3

Riders' Championship standings

Constructors' Championship standings

Teams' Championship standings

MotoE

Notes

References

External links

Austrian
Motorcycle Grand Prix
Motorcycle Grand Prix
Austrian motorcycle Grand Prix
Motorcycle racing controversies